"Freeforall" is a 1986 short story by Margaret Atwood.

Summary
The story is set in the near future, a time of widespread and rampant sexually transmitted disease, in Toronto, Ontario, Canada. It describes a dystopian society with extremely limited freedoms tightly regulated by a totalitarian state in the name of saving society from the sexually transmitted diseases. The world's population is tightly segregated with the infected living somewhere on the "outside" presumably in deplorable conditions and left to their own devices. The presumed anarchy and privation will lead to the natural elimination of the diseases when all the human carriers are dead. Moral value has been placed on disease with the infected being treated as having brought the trouble onto themselves. The infected are condemned and are left to perish with no assistance offered from the "inside". Minimal detail is supplied about the "outside" world and it is referred to only indirectly and reflected in the fears of the healthy inside population.

The "inside" presumably healthy population lives under extreme duress and gender roles appear to be breaking down. The veiled reference to a "turkey baster" as necessary ingredient to maintain a semblance of a marriage is provided toward the end of the story.

The story supplies few details but succeeds in painting the mood and the context of the world in highly vivid colors. The sense of paranoia and anxiety and fear of the "healthy" population is omnipresent and overwhelming. Religious, totalitarian, radical evangelical currents run through the story and appear to question or perhaps mock the current system.

Publication History
 Northern Suns: The New Anthology of Canadian Science Fiction

See also 

 The Handmaid's Tale, a dystopian novel with related themes, by the same author

1986 short stories
Short stories by Margaret Atwood
Toronto in fiction